The VCU Rams women's soccer team is an intercollegiate varsity sports team of Virginia Commonwealth University. The team is a member of the Atlantic 10 Conference of the National Collegiate Athletic Association.

Colors and badge 
The team uses the school colors of black and gold.

Stadium 
VCU plays at Sports Backers Stadium which opened in 1999 and has a maximum capacity of 3,250.

2014 squad

References

External links 

 
Soccer clubs in Virginia
1954 establishments in Virginia
NCAA Division I women's soccer teams